The Cotton Exchange Building is a historic building located in downtown Houston. Built in 1884, it is listed on the National Register of Historic Places. The Houston Cotton Exchange and Board of Trade commissioned local architect Eugene Heiner to design a three-story building on Travis Street at the corner of Franklin in Houston.  In 1907, the building was remodeled and a fourth floor added.  The Houston Cotton Exchange continued to use the building until it moved its operations to a new building several blocks away at Prairie and Caroline in 1924.   	

John Hannah and Jesse Edmundson, III purchased the Cotton Exchange Building in 1973.  They restored the building and sold it in 1983. Preservation Houston acknowledged Hannah's restoration work in 1979 with a Good Brick Award.

Gallery

See also
 National Register of Historic Places listings in Harris County, Texas

References

National Register of Historic Places in Houston
Commercial buildings completed in 1884
Romanesque Revival architecture in Texas
Renaissance Revival architecture in Texas
Buildings and structures in Harris County, Texas
Buildings and structures in Houston
1884 establishments in Texas
Commercial buildings on the National Register of Historic Places in Texas
Recorded Texas Historic Landmarks
1880s architecture in the United States
Cotton industry in the United States